Anton Tereschenko (born 20 September 1995) is a Belarusian professional footballer.

References

External links
 Profile at pressball.by
 
 
 Profile at Gomel website

1995 births
Living people
Belarusian footballers
Association football midfielders
FC Gomel players
FC Granit Mikashevichi players
FC UAS Zhitkovichi players
FC Naftan Novopolotsk players